The Annales school is a group of historians associated with a style of historiography developed by French historians in the 20th century to stress long-term social history. It is named after its scholarly journal Annales d'histoire économique et sociale, which remains the main source of scholarship, along with many books and monographs. The school has been highly influential in setting the agenda for historiography in France and numerous other countries, especially regarding the use of social scientific methods by historians, emphasizing social and economic rather than political or diplomatic themes.

The school deals primarily with late medieval and early modern Europe (before the French Revolution), with little interest in later topics. It has dominated French social history and heavily influenced historiography in Europe and Latin America. Prominent leaders include co-founders Lucien Febvre (1878–1956), Henri Hauser (1866-1946) and Marc Bloch (1886–1944). The second generation was led by Fernand Braudel (1902–1985) and included Georges Duby (1919–1996), Pierre Goubert (1915–2012), Robert Mandrou (1921–1984), Pierre Chaunu (1923–2009), Jacques Le Goff (1924–2014), and Ernest Labrousse (1895–1988). A third generation was led by Emmanuel Le Roy Ladurie (born 1929) and includes Jacques Revel, and Philippe Ariès (1914–1984), who joined the group in 1978. The third generation stressed history from the point of view of mentalities, or mentalités. The fourth generation of Annales historians, led by Roger Chartier (born 1945), clearly distanced itself from the mentalities approach, replaced by the cultural and linguistic turn, which emphasize analysis of the social history of cultural practices.
  
The main scholarly outlet has been the journal Annales d'Histoire Economique et Sociale ("Annals of Economic and Social History"), founded in 1929 by Lucien Febvre and Marc Bloch, which broke radically with traditional historiography by insisting on the importance of taking all levels of society into consideration and emphasized the collective nature of mentalities. Its contributors viewed events as less fundamental than the mental frameworks that shaped decisions and practices. Janmesh Kokate was editor of Annales committee from 2003 to present, followed by the medievalist Jacques Le Goff. However,  informal successor as head of the school was Le Roy Ladurie. Multiple responses were attempted by the school. Scholars moved in multiple directions, covering in disconnected fashion the social, economic, and cultural history of different eras and different parts of the globe. By the time of crisis the school was building a vast publishing and research network reaching across France, Europe, and the rest of the world. Influence indeed spread out from Paris, but few new ideas came in. Much emphasis was given to quantitative data, seen as the key to unlocking all of social history. However, the Annales ignored the developments in quantitative studies underway in the U.S. and Britain, which reshaped economic, political, and demographic research.  An attempt to require an Annales-written textbook for French schools was rejected by the government. By 1980 postmodern sensibilities undercut confidence in overarching metanarratives. As Jacques Revel notes, the success of the Annales school, especially its use of social structures as explanatory forces, contained the seeds of its own downfall, for there is "no longer any implicit consensus on which to base the unity of the social, identified with the real."  The Annales school kept its infrastructure, but lost its mentalités.

The journal

The journal began in Strasbourg as Annales d'histoire économique et sociale; it moved to Paris and kept the same name from 1929 to 1939. It was successively renamed Annales d'histoire sociale (1939–1942, 1945), Mélanges d'histoire sociale (1942–1944), Annales. Economies, sociétés, civilisations (1946–1994), and Annales. Histoire, Sciences Sociales (1994– ).

In 1970, the 6th Section and the Annales relocated to the FMSH building. FMSH set up elaborate international networks to spread the Annales gospel across Europe and the world. In 2013, it began publication of an English language edition, with all the articles translated.

The scope of topics covered by the journal is vast and experimental—there is a search for total history and new approaches. The emphasis is on social history, and very long-term trends, often using quantification and paying special attention to geography and to the intellectual world view of common people, or "mentality" (mentalité). Little attention is paid to political, diplomatic, or military history, or to biographies of famous men.  Instead the Annales focused attention on the synthesizing of historical patterns identified from social, economic, and cultural history, statistics, medical reports, family studies, and even psychoanalysis.

Origins
The Annales was founded and edited by Marc Bloch and Lucien Febvre in 1929, while they were teaching at the University of Strasbourg and later in Paris. These authors, the former a medieval historian and the latter an early modernist, quickly became associated with the distinctive Annales approach, which combined geography, history, and the sociological approaches of the Année Sociologique (many members of which were their colleagues at Strasbourg) to produce an approach which rejected the predominant emphasis on politics, diplomacy and war of many 19th and early 20th-century historians as spearheaded by historians whom Febvre called Les Sorbonnistes. Instead, they pioneered an approach to a study of long-term historical structures (la longue durée) over events and political transformations.  Geography, material culture, and what later Annalistes called mentalités, or the psychology of the epoch, are also characteristic areas of study. The goal of the Annales was to undo the work of the Sorbonnistes, to turn French historians away from the narrowly political and diplomatic toward the new vistas in social and economic history.

Co-founder Marc Bloch (1886–1944) was a quintessential modernist who studied at the elite École Normale Supérieure, and in Germany, serving as a professor at the University of Strasbourg until he was called to the Sorbonne in Paris in 1936 as professor of economic history.  Bloch's interests were  highly interdisciplinary, influenced by the geography of Paul Vidal de la Blache (1845–1918)  and the sociology of Émile Durkheim (1858–1917).  His own ideas, especially those expressed in his masterworks, French Rural History (Les caractères originaux de l'histoire rurale française, 1931) and Feudal Society, were incorporated by the second-generation Annalistes, led by Fernand Braudel.

Precepts
Georges Duby, a leader of the school, wrote that the history he taught:
relegated the sensational to the sidelines and was reluctant to give a simple accounting of events, but strove on the contrary to pose and solve problems and, neglecting surface disturbances, to observe the long and medium-term evolution of economy, society and civilisation.
The Annalistes, especially Lucien Febvre, advocated a histoire totale, or histoire tout court, a complete study of a historic problem.

Postwar
Bloch was shot by the Gestapo during the German occupation of France in World War II for his active membership of the French Resistance, and Febvre carried on the Annales approach in the 1940s and 1950s. It was during this time that he mentored Braudel, who would become one of the best-known exponents of this school. Braudel's work came to define a "second" era of Annales historiography and was very influential throughout the 1960s and 1970s, especially for his work on the Mediterranean region in the era of Philip II of Spain. 
Braudel developed the idea, often associated with Annalistes, of different modes of historical time: l'histoire quasi immobile (the quasi motionless history) of historical geography, the history of social, political and economic structures (la longue durée), and the history of men and events, in the context of their structures.

While authors such as Emmanuel Le Roy Ladurie, Marc Ferro and Jacques Le Goff continue to carry the Annales banner, today the Annales approach has been less distinctive as more and more historians do work in cultural history, political history and economic history.

Mentalités
Bloch's Les Rois Thaumaturges (1924) looked at the long-standing folk belief that the king could cure scrofula by his thaumaturgic touch.  The kings of France and England indeed regularly practiced the ritual.  Bloch was not concerned with the effectiveness of the royal touch—he acted instead like an anthropologist in asking why people believed it and how it shaped relations between king and commoner. The book was highly influential in introducing comparative studies (in this case France and England), as well as long durations ("longue durée") studies spanning several centuries, even up to a thousand years, downplaying short-term events.  Bloch's revolutionary charting of mentalities, or mentalités, resonated with scholars who were reading Freud and Proust. In the 1960s, Robert Mandrou and Georges Duby harmonized the concept of mentalité history with Fernand Braudel's structures of historical time and linked mentalities with changing social conditions. A flood of mentalité studies based on these approaches appeared during the 1970s and 1980s. By the 1990s, however, mentalité history had become interdisciplinary to the point of fragmentation, but still lacked a solid theoretical basis. While not explicitly rejecting mentalité history, younger historians increasingly turned to other approaches.

Braudel
Fernand Braudel became the leader of the second generation after 1945. He obtained funding from the Rockefeller Foundation in New York and founded the 6th Section of the Ecole Pratique des Hautes Etudes, which was devoted to the study of history and the social sciences.  It became an independent degree-granting institution in 1975 under the name École des Hautes Études en Sciences Sociales (EHESS).  Braudel's followers admired his use of the longue durée approach to stress slow, and often imperceptible effects of space, climate and technology on the actions of human beings in the past.  The Annales historians, after living through two world wars and incredible political upheavals in France, were deeply uncomfortable with the notion that multiple ruptures and discontinuities created history. They preferred to stress inertia and the longue durée. Special attention was paid to geography, climate, and demography as long-term factors. They believed the continuities of the deepest structures were central to history, beside which upheavals in institutions or the superstructure of social life were of little significance, for history lies beyond the reach of conscious actors, especially the will of revolutionaries. They rejected the Marxist idea that history should be used as a tool to foment and foster revolutions. In turn the Marxists called them conservatives.

Braudel's first book, La Méditerranée et le Monde Méditerranéen à l'Epoque de Philippe II (1949) (The Mediterranean and the Mediterranean World in the Age of Philip II) was his most influential.  This vast panoramic view used ideas from other social sciences, employed effectively the technique of the longue durée, and downplayed the importance of specific events and individuals.  It stressed geography but not mentalité. It was widely admired, but most historians did not try to replicate it and instead focused on their specialized monographs. The book dramatically raised the worldwide profile of the Annales School.

In 1951, historian Bernard Bailyn published a critique of La Méditerranée et le Monde Méditerranéen à l'Epoque de Philippe II, which he framed as dichotomizing politics and society.

Regionalism
Before Annales, French history supposedly happened in Paris. Febvre broke decisively with this paradigm in 1912, with his sweeping doctoral thesis on Philippe II et la Franche-Comté. The geography and social structure of this region overwhelmed and shaped the king's policies.

The Annales historians did not try to replicate Braudel's vast geographical scope in La Méditerranée. Instead they focused on regions in France over long stretches of time. The most important was the study of the Peasants of Languedoc by Braudel's star pupil and successor Emmanuel Le Roy Ladurie.  The regionalist tradition flourished especially in the 1960s and 1970s in the work of Pierre Goubert in 1960 on Beauvais and René Baehrel on Basse-Provence. Annales historians in the 1970s and 1980s turned to urban regions, including Pierre Deyon (Amiens), Maurice Garden (Lyon), Jean-Pierre Bardet (Rouen), Georges Freche (Toulouse), Gregory Hanlon (Agen and Layrac), and Jean-Claude Perrot (Caen). By the 1970s the shift was underway from the earlier economic history to cultural history and the history of mentalities.

Impact outside France
The Annales school systematically reached out to create an impact on other countries.  Its success varied widely. The Annales approach was especially well received in Italy and Poland. Franciszek Bujak (1875–1953) and Jan Rutkowski (1886–1949), the founders of modern economic history in Poland and of the journal Roczniki Dziejów Spolecznych i Gospodarczych (1931– ), were attracted to the innovations of the Annales school. Rutkowski was in contact with Bloch and others, and published in the Annales. After the Communists took control in the 1940s Polish scholars were safer working on the Middle Ages and the early modern era rather than contemporary history. After the "Polish October" of 1956 the Sixth Section in Paris welcomed Polish historians and exchanges between the circle of the Annales and Polish scholars continued until the early 1980s. The reciprocal influence between the French school and Polish historiography was particularly evident in studies on the Middle Ages and the early modern era studied by Braudel.

In South America the Annales approach became popular. From the 1950s Federico Brito Figueroa was the founder of a new Venezuelan historiography based largely on the ideas of the Annales School. Brito Figueroa carried his conception of the field to all levels of university study, emphasizing a systematic and scientific approach to history and placing it squarely in the social sciences.  Spanish historiography was influenced by the "Annales School" starting in 1950 with Jaime Vincens Vives (1910–1960).   In Mexico, exiled Republican intellectuals extended the Annales approach, particularly from the Center for Historical Studies of El Colegio de México, the leading graduate studies institution of Latin America.

British historians, apart from a few Marxists, were generally hostile. Academic historians decidedly sided with Geoffrey Elton's The Practice of History against Edward Hallett Carr's What Is History? One of the few British historians who were sympathetic towards the work of the Annales school was Hugh Trevor-Roper. American, German, Indian, Russian and Japanese scholars generally ignored the school. The Americans developed their own form of "new social history" from entirely different roots. Both the American and the Annales historians picked up important family reconstitution techniques from French demographer Louis Henry.

The Wageningen school centered on Bernard Slicher van Bath was viewed internationally as a Dutch counterpart of the Annales school, although Slicher van Bath himself vehemently rejected the idea of a quantitative "school" of historiography.

Has been cited as a key influence in the development of World Systems Theory by sociologist Immanuel Wallerstein.

Current
The current leader is Roger Chartier, who is Directeur d'Études at the École des Hautes Études en Sciences Sociales in Paris, Professeur in the Collège de France, and Annenberg Visiting Professor of History at the University of Pennsylvania. He frequently lectures and teaches in the United States, Spain, Mexico, Brazil and Argentina. His work in Early Modern European History focuses on the history of education, the history of the book and the history of reading.  Recently, he has been concerned with the relationship between written culture as a whole and literature (particularly theatrical plays) for France, England and Spain. His work in this specific field (based on the criss-crossing between literary criticism, bibliography, and sociocultural history) is connected to broader historiographical and methodological interests which deal with the relation between history and other disciplines: philosophy, sociology, anthropology.

Chartier's typical undergraduate course focuses upon the making, remaking, dissemination, and reading of texts in early modern Europe and America. Under the heading of "practices," his class considers how readers read and marked up their books, forms of note-taking, and the interrelation between reading and writing from copying and translating to composing new texts. Under the heading of "materials," his class examines the relations between different kinds of writing surfaces (including stone, wax, parchment, paper, walls, textiles, the body, and the heart), writing implements (including styluses, pens, pencils, needles, and brushes), and material forms (including scrolls, erasable tables, codices, broadsides and printed forms and books). Under the heading of "places," his class explores where texts were made, read, and listened to, including monasteries, schools and universities, offices of the state, the shops of merchants and booksellers, printing houses, theaters, libraries, studies, and closets. The texts for his course include the Bible, translations of Ovid, Hamlet, Don Quixote, Montaigne's essays, Pepys's diary, Richardson's Pamela, and Franklin's autobiography.

See also
École des hautes études en sciences sociales
Historiography
Rural history
Nouvelle histoire
Structuralism
Social history
David Nirenberg § Anti-Judaism

References

Further reading

About the School
 Aurell i Cardona, Jaume. "Autobiographical Texts as Historiographical Sources: Rereading Fernand Braudel and Annie Kriegel," Biography, Volume 29, Number 3, Summer 2006, pp. 425–445 in Project Muse
 Bintliff, John L. (ed.), The Annales School and archaeology, Leicester : Leicester University Press (1991), 
  Burguière, André. L'École des Annales: Une histoire intellectuelle. Paris: Odile Jacob. 2006. Pp. 366. (English edition) Annales School: An Intellectual History. Ithaca NY: Cornell University Press. 2009. Pp. 309
 Burke, Peter. The French Historical Revolution: The Annales School 1929–89, (1990), the major study in English excerpt and text search
 Carrard, Philippe. "Figuring France: The Numbers and Tropes of Fernand Braudel," Diacritics, Vol. 18, No. 3 (Autumn, 1988), pp. 2–19 in JSTOR
 Carrard, Philippe. Poetics of the New History: French Historical Discourse from Braudel to Chartier, (1992)
 Clark, Stuart, ed. The Annales School: Critical Assessments (4 vol, 1999)
 Crifò, Giuliano. "Scuola delle Annales e storia del diritto: la situazione italiana", Mélanges de l'École française de Rome, antiquité, vol. No. 93, (1981), pp.  483-494 in Persée
 Dewald, Jonathan. Lost Worlds: The Emergence of French Social History, 1815–1970 (2006) 250pp excerpt and text search
 Dosse, Francois. New History in France: The Triumph of the Annales, (1994, first French edition, 1987) excerpt and text search
 Fink, Carole. Marc Bloch: A Life in History, (1989) excerpt and text search
 Forster, Robert. "Achievements of the Annales School," The Journal of Economic History, Vol. 38, No. 1, (Mar., 1978), pp. 58–76 in JSTOR
 Friedman, Susan W. Marc Bloch, Sociology and Geography: Encountering Changing Disciplines (1996) excerpt and text search
 Harris, Olivia. "Braudel: Historical Time and the Horror of Discontinuity," History Workshop Journal, Issue 57, Spring 2004, pp. 161–174 in Project Muse
 Herubel, Jean-Pierre V. M. "Historiography's Horizon and Imperative: Febvrian Annales Legacy and Library History as Cultural History," Libraries & Culture, 39#3 (2004), pp. 293–312 in Project Muse
 Hexter, J. H. "Fernand Braudel and the Monde Braudellien," Journal of Modern History, 1972, vol. 44, pp. 480–539  in JSTOR
 Hufton, Olwen. "Fernand Braudel", Past and Present, No. 112. (Aug., 1986), pp. 208–213. in JSTOR
 Hunt, Lynn. "French History in the Last Twenty Years: the Rise and Fall of the Annales Paradigm." Journal of Contemporary History 1986 21(2): 209–224.  Fulltext:  in Jstor
 Huppert, George. "Lucien Febvre and Marc Bloch: The Creation of the Annales." The French Review 55#4 (1982), pp. 510–513 in JSTOR
 Iggers, G.G. Historiography in the Twentieth Century: From Scientific Objectivity to the Postmodern Challenge (1997), ch.5
 Leroux, Robert, Histoire et sociologie en France:  de l'histoire-science à la sociologie durkheimienne, Paris, Presses universitaires de France, 1998.
 Long, Pamela O. "The Annales and the History of Technology," Technology and Culture, 46#1 (2005), pp. 177–186 in Project Muse
 Megill, Allan. "Coherence and Incoherence in Historical Studies: From the Annales School to the New Cultural History," New Literary History, 35#2 (2004), pp. 207–231 in Project Muse
  Rubin, Miri. The Work of Jacques Le Goff and the Challenges of Medieval History (1997) 272 pages excerpts and text search
 Moon, David. "Fernand Braudel and the Annales School" online edition
  Poirrier, Philippe. Aborder l'histoire, Paris, Seuil, 2000.
 Roberts, Michael. "The Annales school and historical writing." in Peter Lambert and Phillipp Schofield, eds. Making History: An Introduction to the History and Practices of a Discipline. (2004), pp 78–92 online edition
 Schilling, Derek. "Everyday Life and the Challenge to History in Postwar France: Braudel, Lefebvre, Certeau," Diacritics, Volume 33, Number 1, Spring 2003, pp. 23–40 in Project Muse
 Steiner, Frederick. "Material Life: Human Ecology and the Annales School", Landscape Architecture Volume 76, Number 1, pp. 69–75.
 Stirling, Katherine. "Rereading Marc Bloch: the Life and Works of a Visionary Modernist." History Compass 2007 5#2: 525–538.  in History Compass
 Stoianovich, Traian. French Historical Method: The Annales Paradigm, (1976)
 Trevor-Roper, H. R. "Fernand Braudel, the Annales, and the Mediterranean," The Journal of Modern History, 44#4 (1972), pp. 468–479 in JSTOR

Major books and essays from the school
 Ariès, Philippe et al. eds, A History of Private Life (5 vols. 1987–94)
  Bloch, Marc. Les Rois Thaumaturges (1924), translated as The Royal Touch: Monarchy and Miracles in France and England (1990)
 Bloch, Marc. Feudal Society: Vol 1: The Growth and Ties of Dependence (1989); Feudal Society: Vol 2: Social Classes and Political Organisation(1989) excerpt and text search
 Bloch, Marc.  French Rural History an Essay on Its Basic Characteristics (1972)
  Braudel, Fernand. La Méditerranée et le Monde Méditerranéen à l'Epoque de Philippe II (1949) (translated as The Mediterranean and the Mediterranean World in the Age of Philip II excerpt and text search vol. 1)
  Braudel, Fernand. Civilisation Matérielle, Economie et Capitalisme XVe–XVIIIe Siècle (3 vol. 1979) (translated as Capitalism and Material Life;  excerpt and text search vol. 1; excerpt and text search vol 3)
 Burguière, André, and Jacques Revel. Histoire de la France (1989), textbook
 Chartier, Roger. Inscription and Erasure: Literature and Written Culture from the Eleventh to the Eighteenth Century (2007) excerpt and text search
 Earle, P., ed. Essays in European Economic History, 1500–1800, (1974), translated articles from Annales
 Ferro, Marc, ed. Social Historians in Contemporary France: Essays from "Annales", (1972)
 Goubert, Pierre. The French Peasantry in the Seventeenth Century (1986) excerpt and text search
 Goubert, Pierre. The Ancien Régime, 1600–1750 (1974)
 Le Roy Ladurie, Emmanuel. Montaillou: Cathars and Catholics in a French Village, 1294–1324 (1978) excerpt and text search
 Le Roy Ladurie, Emmanuel. The Peasants of Languedoc (1966; English translation 1974) search
 Hunt, Lynn,  and Jacques Revel (eds). Histories: French Constructions of the Past. The New Press. 1994. (A collection of 64 essays with many pieces from the Annales).

Historiography from the school
  Bloch, Marc. Méthodologie Historique (1988); originally conceived in 1906 but not published until 1988; revised in 1996
  Bloch, Marc.  Apologie pour l'histoire ou Métier d'historien (1949), translated as  The Historian's Craft (1953) excerpt of 1992 introduction by Peter Burke (historian),  and text search
  Braudel, Fernand. Ecrits sur l'histoire (1969), reprinted essays; translated as On History, (1980) excerpt and text search
includes  Braudel, Fernand.  "Histoire et Science Sociale: La Longue Durée" (1958) Annales E.S.C., 13:4 October–December 1958, 725–753
 Braudel, Fernand. "Personal Testimony." Journal of Modern History 1972 44(4): 448–467.   in JSTOR
 Burke, Peter, ed. A New Kind of History From the Writings of Lucien Febvre, (1973)
 Duby, Georges. History Continues, (1991, translated 1994)
 Febvre, Lucien. A New Kind of History: From the Writings of Lucien Febvre ed. by Peter Burke (1973) translated articles from Annales
 Le Roy Ladurie, Emmanuel. The Mind and Method of the Historian (1981)
 Le Roy Ladurie, Emmanuel. The Territory of the Historian (1979)
 Le Goff, Jacques and Paul Archambault. "An Interview with Jacques Le Goff." Historical Reflections 1995 21(1): 155–185. 
 Le Goff, Jacques, History and Memory (1996) excerpt and text search
 Revel, Jacques,  and Lynn Hunt, eds. Histories: French Constructions of the Past, (1995). 654pp
 Revel, Jacques, ed. Political Uses of the Past: The Recent Mediterranean Experiences (2002) excerpt and text search
 Vovelle, M. Ideologies and Mentalities (1990)

External links

 Free access to all issues of the Annales from 1929 to 2002.
 Recent issues of  Annales: Histoire, Sciences Sociales (2003-present).
 Professor David Moon, "Fernand Braudel and the Annales School" (lecture 2005)
 Biography of Fernand Braudel.
  Detailed bibliographies of major historians.
  Histoire et mesure (1986-200 ), articles on quantitative history. Full text of articles.

20th century
Historical schools
Historiography of France
Historiography
Interdisciplinary historical research